Lamen Island is an inhabited island in Shefa Province of Vanuatu in the Pacific Ocean. The island is a part of Shepherd Islands archipelago.

Geography
Lamen lies 1 km west of the Epi Island. Lamen spans 1.6 km from the north to the south and 1.2 km from the east to the west. The island is flat; its estimated terrain elevation above the sea level is some 34 metres.

Population
As of 2015, the official local population was 459 people in 93 households. Some local people speak Lamenu language.

Language
The Lamen language is spoken on the island.

References

Islands of Vanuatu
Shefa Province